The RN-8 National Highway is a national highway in the southern of Djibouti. The highway is heavily traveled by Ethiopian trucks.

References

Roads in Djibouti